The grey-chested greenlet (Hylophilus semicinereus) is a species of bird in the family Vireonidae.
It is found in Bolivia, Brazil, Colombia, French Guiana, Peru, and Venezuela.
Its natural habitats are subtropical or tropical moist lowland forests and heavily degraded former forest.

References

grey-chested greenlet
Birds of the Amazon Basin
Birds of Brazil
grey-chested greenlet
grey-chested greenlet
grey-chested greenlet
Taxonomy articles created by Polbot